The 2007−08 season of the Primera División Uruguaya is the 76th professional season of Uruguay's top-flight football league.

Teams

Torneo Apertura

Top scorers

Torneo Clausura

Clausura tiebreaker

Top scorers

Aggregate table

Championship playoff
The Apertura and Clausura winners will play a semifinal match. The winner will advance to the final and play against the best team in the aggregate table.

Semifinal

Final
Since Defensor Sporting was the best team in the aggregate as well as the semifinal winner, they were automatically declared the champion.

Relegation table
The relegation table is an aggregate of the past two Primera División seasons, with the exception of the Liguilla Pre-Libertadores and any playoffs. Teams that were promoted for this season had their statistics doubled. The three lowest teams will be relegated for the next season.

Liguilla Pre-Libertadores

Liguilla 1st place tiebreaker
The winner of the match earns the Uruguay 1 spot in the 2009 Copa Libertadores; the loser gets the Uruguay 2 spot.

See also
2007–08 in Uruguayan football

References

External links
2007–08 season on RSSSF

Uruguayan Primera División seasons
1
Uru
Uru